A Christmas market, also known as Christkindlmarkt (literally: Christ Child Market, but the term "Christkind" usually refers to an angel-like "spirit of Christmas" rather than literally the Christ Child), Christkindlesmarkt, Christkindlimarkt, and Weihnachtsmarkt, is a street market associated with the celebration of Christmas during the four weeks of Advent. These markets originated in Germany, but are now held in many countries. Some in the U.S. have adapted the name to the quasi-German Christkindlmarket, naively substituting market for German Markt.

Christmas markets date to the Late Middle Ages in the German-speaking part of Europe and in many parts of the former Holy Roman Empire that included many eastern regions of France. They became a popular Advent custom during the Reformation era. Dresden's Striezelmarkt was first held in 1434 and one of the first true Christmas markets; earlier markets of the season were "December markets". Early mentions of these "December markets" can be found in Vienna (1298), Munich (1310), Bautzen (1384), and Frankfurt (1393).

In many towns in Germany, Switzerland, and Austria, Advent is usually ushered in with the opening of the Christmas market or "Weihnachtsmarkt". In southern Germany, Switzerland and Austria, it is called a "Christkind(e)l(s)(i)markt" (German language, literally meaning "Christ child market"). Traditionally held in the town square, the market offers food, drinks and seasonal items for sale from open-air stalls, accompanied by traditional singing and dancing. On opening night at the Christkindlesmarkt in Nuremberg, and in some other towns, onlookers welcome the "Christkind" (originally boy Jesus, but often depicted as an angel-like girl), acted by a local child.

Attractions and stalls 
Popular attractions at the markets include the Nativity Scene (a crèche or crib), Zwetschgenmännle (figures made of decorated dried plums), Nussknacker (carved Nutcrackers), Gebrannte Mandeln (candied, toasted almonds), traditional Christmas cookies such as Lebkuchen and Magenbrot (both forms of soft gingerbread), Bratwurst, and Glühwein, hot mulled wine (with or without a shot of brandy), or Eierpunsch (an egg-based warm alcoholic drink) -  both a highlight of the market for many visitors. Both help stave off the cold winter air which sometimes dips below freezing. More regional food specialties include Christstollen (Stollen), a sort of bread with candied fruit in Saxony, and hot Apfelwein and Frankfurter Bethmännchen in Hesse.

Major Christmas markets 

Famous Christmas markets are held in the cities of Augsburg, Dresden, Erfurt, Frankfurt, Nuremberg, and Stuttgart, making them popular tourist attractions during the Christmas holiday season.  The Nuremberg and Dresden markets draw about two million people each year; the Stuttgart and Frankfurt markets attract more than three million visitors. 

Additionally, the city of Berlin claims more than 70 markets, which open in late November and close just after Christmas.

Christmas markets are also popular traditions in Austria, and are held in Vienna, Salzburg, Innsbruck, Linz, and Graz. The first "December Market" was held in Vienna in 1298. Vienna holds 20 different Christmas markets around the city. Most Christmas markets open in late November and last through December, closing right after 25 December, with a few staying open for New Year's. The largest Christmas market and one of the most well known is the Vienna Christmas World on Rathausplatz, near the Rathaus, Vienna's historic city hall. The market draws 3 million people each year and includes 150 unique stalls that offer traditional Austrian foods, Christmas decorations and ornaments, handicrafts, and drinks. The Vienna Christmas World on Rathausplatz also features an advent theme park called the Adventzauber with workshops and cultural performances that cater to families and young children. Visitors to the Vienna Christmas World can also ice skate on a  ice rink and on frozen paths that run through the Rathausplatz Park. Other famous Christmas markets include the Christmas Market at Schönbrunn Palace, the Art Advent on Karlsplatz, the Christmas Village at Belvedere Palace, and the Christmas Village on Maria-Theresien-Platz. The Christmas Market at Schönbrunn Palace, “Kultur-und-Weihnachtsmarkt,” takes place in front of the imperial palace. It features Austrian handicrafts and goods as well as a cultural program with activities and workshops. The Art Advent on Karlsplatz offers artisan goods, a children's program, and a petting zoo. Popular food specialities include Kinderpunsch (a non-alcoholic punch), Glühwein, Baumstriezel (a Hungarian pastry coated in cinnamon and sugar), Kartoffelpuffer (potato pancakes), Lángos (savory deep fried dough), Schaumkuss (chocolate covered marshmallows), Stollen (bread with candied fruit), Maroni (roasted chestnuts), Bratkartoffel (roasted potato wedges), Lebkuchen (Austrian gingerbread), and baked potatoes.

Christmas markets are traditional in Alsace, and most of the towns have their local Christmas market. Strasbourg, in Alsace, France, has been holding a Christmas market, "Christkindelsmärik," around its cathedral since 1570, when the city was part of the Holy Roman Empire of the German Nation.

As noted, other countries have also established such markets. The Christmas market of Barcelona starts on 13 December, Saint Lucy's Day, and is called Fira de Santa Llúcia. It has been held in the square of Barcelona Cathedral since 1786.

In 1982, Lincoln, England, established an annual Christmas market in early December. This remains one of the most extensive such market by area in the United Kingdom, with a claimed total of over 300 stalls attracting more than 100,000 visitors over its four days. Starting in 1997, Frankfurt Christmas Markets were established with support from Frankfurt in Birmingham, Edinburgh, Leeds, and Manchester. Other large Christmas markets have been held in England in Bath (since 2000) and Liverpool (since 2006). The Christmas markets are such a success that they are becoming a major pull factor to increase trade and visitor numbers to towns and cities. 

Birmingham's Christmas Market, primarily located on New Street between the Bullring shopping centre and the Council House, is the "largest outdoor Christmas market in the UK" as well as the "largest authentic German Christmas market outside of Germany or Austria". The market also offers live entertainment on the main stage. The market is held for approximately six weeks every year and usually closes around 23 December. Manchester's Christmas Markets have also been successful, with 300 stalls over eight city locations, with each location being themed to create a different atmosphere such as French, World, and German, with European-themed stalls on the Albert Square, Manchester proving to be the most popular.

German immigrants carried Christmas market celebrations to the United States. It is celebrated in such cities as Chicago, Denver, and Tulsa.

A traditional Christmas market was held for the first time in Sibiu, Romania, in 2007.

Gallery

See also 

2000 Strasbourg Cathedral bombing plot
2016 Berlin truck attack
2018 Strasbourg attack

References

Further reading 
 Bakst, Alex: "A Visit to Germany's Christmas Markets", Spiegel Online 7 December 2006
 Zug, J.D. (1991): German-American Life: Recipes and Traditions, Iowa City: Penfield Press

External links 
 
 

1434 establishments in Europe
1430s establishments in the Holy Roman Empire
Christmas events and celebrations
Christmas markets
Christmas in Austria
Christmas in Germany
Christmas traditions
History of Dresden
Articles containing video clips
1298 establishments in Europe
1290s establishments in the Holy Roman Empire